Iodowynnea is a genus of fungi within the Pezizaceae family. This is a monotypic genus, containing the single species Iodowynnea auriformis.

References

External links
Index Fungorum

Pezizaceae
Monotypic Ascomycota genera
Pezizales genera